Atatürk Spor Salonu is a light rail station on the Konak Tram line in İzmir, Turkey. This stop is planned afterwards and opened after the original route has been completed.

Nearby places of interest
 Konak Swimming Pool
 Konak Sports Hall

References

Railway stations opened in 2018
2018 establishments in Turkey
Konak District
Tram transport in İzmir
Things named after Mustafa Kemal Atatürk